Transtillaspis protungurahuana is a species of moth of the family Tortricidae. It is found in Tungurahua Province, Ecuador.

The wingspan is about 18 mm. The ground colour of the forewings is whitish cream up to the middle of the wing, mixed with brownish in the basal and costal parts and suffused with brownish in the distal part of the wing. The strigulation (fine streaks), suffusions and dots are brownish and the marking are brown. The hindwings are white, but brownish on peripheries.

Etymology
The species name refers to the province of Tungurahua.

References

Moths described in 2010
Transtillaspis
Taxa named by Józef Razowski